The AFP Joint Task Force - National Capital Region, known officially as the JTF-NCR or Task Force NCR, is one of the Armed Forces of the Philippines' Joint Task Forces assigned to combating Terrorism-Insurgency and act as support units to the Philippine National Police-National Capital Region in maintaining peace and order within Metro Manila.

History

AFP NCR Command was formally deactivated on 12 July 2012 following the retirement of its Commanding General, Lieutenant General Tristan M Kison AFP.

Joint Task Force National Capital Region was formally activated that same day to assume the roles handed over by the former command, including providing assistance to the Presidential Security Group in securing the seat of power in Malacañan.

Organization
The following are the units operating under or attached with the AFP JTF-NCR:
Base Units
 Headquarters & Headquarters Service Support Company
 GHQ K-9 Unit
 GHQ EOD Company

Line Units
 Joint Special Operations Group (NCR Component)
 Joint Task Force NCR - Disaster Rescue & Relief Management Unit
 Presidential Security Group
 7th Civil Relations Group

AFP Technical Services
 1st AFPRESCOM Reserve Center (Provisional)

Philippine Army
 Joint Task Group NCR Land (Philippine Army Component)
 National Capital Region Regional Community Defense Group

Philippine Air Force
 Joint Task Group NCR Air (Philippine Air Force Component)
 1st Air Reserve Center

Philippine Navy
 Joint Task Group NCR Water (Philippine Navy & Marine Corps Component)
 Naval Forces Reserve - NCR

Lineage of Commanders
 COL MANUEL S RAMIRO (GSC) PAF - 11 Jul 2012 - 22 Mar 2013
 BGEN MANUEL S GONZALES AFP - 28 Jun 2013 - 15 Dec 2014
 BGEN APOLINARIO Y ALOBBA AFP - 15 Dec 2014 - 04 Jul 2016
 COL VICENTE GREGORIO B TOMAS (GSC) PA (OIC) - 04 Jul 2016 -
 BGEN ROBERTO D DOMINES JR AFP

See also
 National Capital Regional Command (Philippines)

Operations
 Anti-guerrilla operations against the New People's Army
 Anti-terrorist operations against known terror groups operating in their AOR.
 Community Development of identified urban poor areas within the National Capital Region
 Intelligence and Counter-Intelligence Operations against government destabilizers.

References

Bibliography
 Official Site of the AFP.
 Official Site of the AFP JTF-NCR.

Regional commands of the Philippines
Military units and formations established in 2012